Thanjavur Radhakrishnan Rajayee (5 May 1922 – 20 September 1999), known by her screen name T. R. Rajakumari, was an Indian actress, Carnatic singer and dancer. She has been called the first "dream girl" of Tamil cinema.

Film career 
Rajayee made her film debut in "Kumara Kulothungan" which was produced in 1938–39 but was released in 1941 after Kacha Devayani. In the initial ads her name appeared as T. R. Rajayee but later in the film she was credited as T. R. Rajalakshmi. Her second film was Mandharavathi directed by D.S. Marconi was also released in 1941. Kacha Devayani (1941) was a hit and helped launch her career in movies. There is some confusion about in which film she actually made her debut as Kacha Devayani's director K. Subramaniam later insisted that he was the one who introduced her to films. In 1944, Rajakumari starred in the record-breaking film Haridas alongside M. K. Thyagaraja Bhagavathar and gained recognition for her glamorous portrayal.

In her Tamil film career, Rajakumari acted as the female lead to many major film stars including Thyagaraja Bhagavathar, T. R. Mahalingam, K. R. Ramasamy, P. U. Chinnappa, M. G. Ramachandran and Sivaji Ganesan. She also started a film production company (with her brother T. R. Ramanna) called "R. R. Pictures" and produced films like Vaazhapirandhavan (1953), Koondukkili (1954), Gul-E-Bagaavali (1955), Paasam (1962), Periya Idathu Penn (1963), Panam Padaithavan (1965) and Parakkum Paavai (1966). Her last film as an actress was Vanambadi (1963).

Later life and death 
Rajakumari died on 20 September 1999 after a prolonged illness.

Partial filmography

References

External links 
 

1922 births
1999 deaths
Tamil actresses
People from Thanjavur district
Actresses in Tamil cinema
Singers from Tamil Nadu
Dancers from Tamil Nadu
Women Carnatic singers
Indian female dancers
20th-century Indian actresses
20th-century Indian dancers
Carnatic singers
Indian women classical singers
20th-century Indian women singers
20th-century Indian singers
Women musicians from Tamil Nadu